The USSTRATCOM Center for Combating Weapons of Mass Destruction (SCC-WMD) is a United States Strategic Command center built in cooperation with the Defense Threat Reduction Agency (DTRA).

The SCC-WMD is housed in the Defense Threat Reduction Center (DTRC), the headquarters building of the Defense Threat Reduction Agency (DTRA) that opened January 26, 2006, just outside Washington, D.C.

History and background
At the opening of the new DTRC on January 26, 2006, Dr. James A. Tegnelia, DTRA director, also announced the Initial Operating Capability (IOC) of the SCC-WMD. Guests at the ceremony included:  Sen. Richard Lugar, R-Ind.; Hon. Kenneth J. Kreig, Under Secretary of Defense for Acquisition, Technology, and Logistics; Gen. James E. Cartwright, USMC, Combatant Commander, U.S. Strategic Command; Dale E. Klein, assistant to the secretary of defense for nuclear and chemical and biological defense programs; Stephen Younger, former director of DTRA; and Maj. Gen. Trudy H. Clark, USAF, DTRA deputy director.

Senator Lugar, chairman of the Senate Foreign Relations Committee, was the keynote speaker for the ceremony.

Resources
The components of USSTRATCOM.
 DTRA News Release 26 Jan 06

See also
Defense Threat Reduction Agency
United States Strategic Command
National Counterproliferation Center

United States Department of Defense agencies